Vasile Crișan (born 25 December 1905, date of death unknown) was a Romanian sports shooter. He competed in the 50 m pistol event at the 1936 Summer Olympics.

References

1905 births
Year of death missing
Romanian male sport shooters
Olympic shooters of Romania
Shooters at the 1936 Summer Olympics
Place of birth missing